Jhannett María Madriz Sotillo is a Venezuelan politician and judge. She currently serves as a magistrate of the Electoral Chamber of the Supreme Tribunal of Justice of Venezuela.

Career 
Jhannett was born in Caracas, Venezuela. Between 1998 and 2010 she was an Andean deputy of Venezuela; in Peru she received at least six distinctions for her work as a parliamentarian. She also served as Venezuela's ambassador to Canada until that year.

In 2010 she was appointed by the pro-government National Assembly as a judge of the Supreme Tribunal of Justice of Venezuela.

Sanctions 
Madriz was sanctioned on 30 May 2018 by the government of Canada, following the presidential elections in Venezuela that month, by listing her as an official "responsible for, or complicit in, gross violations" of human rights, "significant acts of corruption, or both.".

See also 

 International sanctions during the Venezuelan crisis

References 

Venezuelan women judges
Venezuelan women in politics
Women ambassadors
Ambassadors of Venezuela to Canada
Year of birth missing (living people)
Living people